Adolfo Alsina Department is a department of Río Negro Province, Argentina. It is named in honor of the 2nd Vice President of Argentina, Adolfo Alsina.

References 

Departments of Río Negro Province